Lux Mundi is the ninth studio album from the heavy metal band Samael, released on 29 April 2011 through Nuclear Blast. The Latin words Lux Mundi translate as "Light of the World".

Track listing

Personnel

Samael
 Vorph – guitar, vocals
 Mak – guitar
 Mas – bass
 Xy – drums, keyboard, programming, production

Technical personnel
 Waldemar Sorychta – production
 Russ Russell – mixing, mastering
 Patrick Pidoux – cover artwork, layout artwork

Charts

References

2011 albums
Samael (band) albums
Season of Mist albums
Albums produced by Waldemar Sorychta